Sinployea decorticata a species of small air-breathing land snail, a terrestrial pulmonate gastropod mollusk in the family Charopidae. This species was endemic to the Cook Islands; it is now extinct.

Shell description 
Sinployea decorticata was originally discovered and described under the name Pitys decorticata by American naturalist Andrew Garrett in 1872.

Garrett's original text (the type description) reads as follows:

The width of the shell is 4 mm. The height of the shell is 2 mm.

Type specimen are stored in the collection of Academy of Natural Sciences in Philadelphia.

Distribution 
Type locality is Rarotonga Island, Cook Islands.

Habitat 
Andrew Garrett commented on the habitat of this land snail, saying it was, "a common species found on the ground in a mountain ravine".

References
This article incorporates public domain text from reference.

Further reading 
 Solem A. (7 January 1983) Endodontoid land snails from Pacific Islands (Mollusca: Pulmonata: Sigmurethra). Part II. Families Punctidae and Charopidae, Zoogeography. Field Museum of Natural History, Chicago, ISSN 0015-0754. Image of Sinployea decorticata is on the page 109, text on page 110.

decorticata
Extinct gastropods
Extinct animals of Oceania
Fauna of the Cook Islands
Molluscs of Oceania
Gastropods described in 1872
Taxonomy articles created by Polbot